Katsuhiko (written: 勝彦, 克彦 or 勝比古) is a masculine Japanese given name. Notable people with the name include:

, Japanese chemist
, Japanese handball player
, Japanese sumo wrestler
, Japanese sumo wrestler
Katsuhiko Kinoshita (born 1973), Japanese handball player and coach
, Japanese seismologist
, Japanese judoka
, Japanese chief executive
, Japanese baseball commissioner
, Japanese decathlete
, Japanese shogi player
, Japanese sport wrestler and mixed martial artist
Japanese actor and musician
, Japanese professional wrestler
, Japanese anime director
, Japanese diplomat
, Japanese actor and voice actor
, Japanese karateka
, Japanese basketball player
, Japanese horse trainer
, Japanese rally driver
, Japanese writer
, Japanese film director
, Japanese photographer
, Japanese mayor
, Japanese politician

See also
7965 Katsuhiko, a main-belt asteroid named after Katsuhiko Sato (born 1945)

Japanese masculine given names